Beata is a genus of jumping spiders that was first described by George Peckham & Elizabeth Peckham in 1895.

Species
 it contains twenty-one species, found in Central America, North America, the Caribbean, Colombia, Paraguay, Argentina, Guyana, and Brazil:
Beata aenea (Mello-Leitão, 1945) – Brazil, Argentina
Beata blauveltae Caporiacco, 1947 – Guyana
Beata cephalica F. O. Pickard-Cambridge, 1901 – Panama
Beata cinereonitida Simon, 1902 – Brazil
Beata fausta (Peckham & Peckham, 1901) – Brazil
Beata germaini Simon, 1902 – Brazil, Paraguay
Beata hispida (Peckham & Peckham, 1901) – Mexico
Beata inconcinna (Peckham & Peckham, 1895) – Trinidad
Beata jubata (C. L. Koch, 1846) – St. Thomas
Beata longipes (F. O. Pickard-Cambridge, 1901) – Panama
Beata lucida (Galiano, 1992) – Argentina
Beata maccuni (Peckham & Peckham, 1895) – Panama to Brazil
Beata magna Peckham & Peckham, 1895 (type) – Guatemala to Colombia
Beata munda Chickering, 1946 – Panama
Beata octopunctata (Peckham & Peckham, 1894) – St. Vincent
Beata pernix (Peckham & Peckham, 1901) – Brazil
Beata rustica (Peckham & Peckham, 1895) – Guatemala to Brazil
Beata striata Petrunkevitch, 1925 – Panama
Beata venusta Chickering, 1946 – Panama
Beata wickhami (Peckham & Peckham, 1894) – USA, Bahama Is., Cuba
Beata zeteki Chickering, 1946 – Panama

References

Salticidae genera
Salticidae
Spiders of North America
Spiders of South America